Butterflies founded by Rita Panicker is a registered voluntary organisation working with vulnerable children, especially street and working children in Delhi since 1989. With a rights based, participatory, non-institutional approach the organisation endeavours to educate and impart life skills to vulnerable children so that they become self-reliant.

Genesis and principles
The idea behind Butterflies began in the 1980s, when Rita Panicker Pinto began interacting with children living on the streets and platforms of Mumbai. She noticed that these children were extremely vulnerable. Rita along with Asst. Professor P. Nangia did a Situational Analysis of Study of Street and Working Children in Delhi for UNICEF in 1988.

Thus was born Butterflies with the core value and belief that it must be a democratic organisation and children's voices have to be listened to seriously. Children's participation in decision making processes is central to Butterflies’ work ethos. It is non institutional in its approach as Butterflies believes that institutionalising children should be the last resort. The importance of strengthening families and communities to protect and take care of children is strongly advocated as families are the first line of defense for children. Butterflies’ emphasis is on supporting children to continue schooling, impart life skills education so that they can exit the cycle of generational poverty and illiteracy.

Since its humble beginnings in 1989, Butterflies has grown into a movement with 140 staff reaching out to almost 3,300 children every year and has touched the lives of almost 71,000 children till date. Even as they grow in numbers, the Butterflies story still centres around protecting and empowering every street and working child in India.

Interventions
Over the years Butterflies has initiated a number of innovative interventions in the field and partnered with various government and non-government agencies to garner support for children. The main programmes are Education, Children's Development Khazana (life skills programme teaching financial management), Child Health Cooperative (CHC), Children's Media (Butterflies Broadcasting Children), Resilience Centre and Childline (1098, 24-hour helpline for children in crisis), Night Shelters for homeless children, vocational training (Butterflies School of Culinary and Catering and Computer Education), Chakhle Dilli catering service, Advocacy and Research Centre (ARC), Alliance Building, Right to Play and Child Social Protection Committee Programme. In the year 2009, on a request by the Delhi High Court, Butterflies also ran a programme for children in conflict with law in an Observation Home for Boys in New Delhi. Butterflies reaches out directly to over 3,300 street and street connected children in Delhi and Uttarakhand. Butterflies is also a member of Family for Every Child, a global alliance of local civil society organisations working together to improve the lives of vulnerable children around the world.

Butterflies flagship programme is the Children's Development Khazana (CDK), a life skills education programme that educates children on democratic values and financial management (educating children on importance of budgeting, saving and prioritizing needs). In addition, children are also taught valuable life skills like communication, gender equality and sensitivity and entrepreneurship. The main aim is to teach street children aged between 9 and 18 to be responsible on managing their finances and any rural, urban and ethnic communities’ child can be a member of Khazana, which is owned  and run by themselves under the guidance of adult guide. These Khazanas are run by the children, for the children where children deposit whatever they earn and every one of them is also given a passbook. Every six months, member children elect a Child Volunteer Manager (CVM) and an Assistant Child Volunteer Manager (ACVM)and after voting the elected CVM and ACVM undergo training on how to run and manage their respective CDK and they are also taught how to manage the Cash Book, Ledger Book and Pass Books of the members and for each implementing organization the amount deposited by children in their CDK account is then deposited in a mainstream bank in a separate CDK account and not in the organisation's account. Founded in 2001, CDK is a cooperative managed and owned by children and as of March 2018, CDK is operational in eight countries across the world where it is working in collaboration with partner organisations(five in Asia, two in Africa) and in nine states and Union Territories of India (Jammu & Kashmir, Kerala, Delhi, Bihar, Jharkhand, Odisha, Rajasthan, Andaman & Nicobar Islands and Maharashtra) with a total membership of 16,912 children (8,981 boys and 7,923 girls) and savings amounting to $82,061. All the money is saved in mainstream banks. Members of the cooperative are also encouraged to save for their future continengencies and are trained in managing their finances.
 
Since 1995, Butterflies has also been running the Child Health Co-operative, for street children where they discuss their health problems and chalk out strategies to combat health problems. The cooperative is based on the principle that children can collectively advocate for services. One of the key objectives of CHC is to promote safe and healthy living among children and communities. As of March 2018, CHC is operational in eight countries across the world and in ten states of India with a total membership of 9,354 children (4,984 boys and 4,370 girls).

Outreach
Founded in 1989 by Rita Panicker, who also serves as its Executive Director, since then the organisation has been working with vulnerable children reaching out directly to over 3,300 street and working children in Delhi and Uttarakhand. In 1987, Panicker and  Dr Praveen Nangia of Jawaharlal Nehru University were conducting a survey among street children on the behalf of UNICEF and it was during this study, Panicker understood that these children aspired for independence and to take charge of their own lives more than anything and this necessity of enabling these kids to participate in decisions relating to their lives became the core value of Butterflies. Through the Children's Cooperatives Programmes (CDK and CHC), Butterflies is also present in eight countries (Afghanistan, India, Nepal, Sri Lanka, Kyrgyzstan, Tajikistan, Madagascar and Ghana) and ten states and Union Territories of India (Jammu and Kashmir, West Bengal, Kerala, Delhi, Bihar, Jharkhand, Orissa, Rajasthan, Andaman and Nicobar Islands and Maharashtra).

The organisation's core belief is children have a right to be heard, to be consulted, to take their views seriously in all decisions that concern them. In keeping with this core value Butterflies facilitated a children's forum in Delhi called Delhi Child Rights Club in 1998 which has children from 13 NGOs as its members. DCRC has commented on various government policies and legislation related to children; the very recent being the draft national policy on children. DCRC has taken up the issue of right to play with the mayors and chief minister of Delhi to get access to play grounds and open spaces for children to play.

In addition, Butterflies has facilitated and is the convenor of National Alliance of Grassroots NGOs for Protection of Child Rights (NAGN), an alliance of 39 grassroots community based organizations from 13 states. Butterflies has also facilitated and is the convenor of South Asian Alliance of Grassroots NGOs (SAAGN) having 136 members from the region. The reason for coming together as an alliance was for the voices of small grassroots organisations to be heard and for Butterflies to lobby for the rights of the most marginalized communities. Best practices are also shared among alliance members who are constantly learning and finding ways to be creative and innovative in their functioning.

Butterflies is also a member of Family for Every Child, a global alliance of local civil society organisations working together to improve the lives of vulnerable children around the world. Rita Panicker, executive director of Butterflies is currently the vice-chair of the board.

Awards and recognition

 Recipient of the International Cooperative Innovation Award 2020 by the U.S. Overseas Cooperative Development Council
 Rita Panicker was awarded the Lifetime Achievement Award 2016 by the National Association of Professional Social Workers in India for her distinct contribution in the domain of child rights, especially street and working children at the 4th Indian Social Work Congress. 
 Rita Panicker was honoured by Shri Amitabh Bachchan on the new Star Plus show Aaj Ki Raat Hai Zindagi in 2015
 Vanitha Woman of the Year 2012 by the Malayala Manorama group. The award was instituted to acknowledge the work done by Malayali women to serve Indian society
 IGSSS Shrestha Puraskar, 2011, by the Indo Global Social Service Society in New Delhi for Panicker's pioneering work with street and working children. 
 Nominated and a finalist for the 2009  Right Livelihood Award. 
 Awarded the Zee Pehal Pioneering Personalities L. N. Goel Award in 2006.  
 Awarded the Women of Social Work Excellence by the Manava Seva Dharma Samvardhani Charitable Trust for Social Service Consciousness, Chennai, on 27 February 2002.  
 Children's Development Khazana started by her organization Butterflies in 2001 received the Second Prize in the 2006 Global Development Network Award for the Most Innovative Development Project.
 The Ramachandran - Ikeda Award 1999 was conferred on Panicker's organization Butterflies

References

External links

Volunteer organisations in India
1948 establishments in India
Organisations based in Delhi
Non-governmental organizations